The Legend of Heroes: Trails from Zero, known as  in Japan, is a 2010 role-playing video game developed by Nihon Falcom. The game is a part of the Trails series, itself a part of the larger The Legend of Heroes series. It takes place in Crossbell, a city-state located between two great powers fighting for control over it, and follows Lloyd Bannings and his colleagues Elie MacDowell, Randy Orlando, and Tio Plato. The four form the Special Support Section, a newly formed department of the Crossbell police. The game and its 2011 sequel, Trails to Azure, form the Crossbell arc of the series.

Trails from Zero was first released in Japan for the PlayStation Portable before being ported to Windows for release in China in 2011. An enhanced port featuring improved visuals and additional voice acting was released for the PlayStation Vita in Japan as Zero no Kiseki: Evolution in 2012. The game received an English fan translation in 2020, which NIS America used as a base for an official version that was released for Nintendo Switch, PlayStation 4, and Windows in September 2022.

Plot
Trails from Zero is set three months after the end of The Legend of Heroes: Trails in the Sky the 3rd, in the city-state of Crossbell. Uneasily situated between two great powers – the Erebonian Empire and the Calvard Republic, both of which claim sovereignty over Crossbell – the city is riven by political tensions, corruption and organized crime.

The protagonist, Lloyd Bannings, is a rookie police detective. At the beginning of Zero, he is assigned to the Special Support Section (SSS), an odd-jobs branch of the city's police department, together with Elie MacDowell, heiress to a political dynasty, Randolph "Randy" Orlando, a laid-back ex-soldier, and Tio Plato, a young girl and electronics genius. During Zero, the SSS investigate the schemes of the city's competing crime syndicates, before stumbling over the plot of the centuries-old D∴G cult to raise a young girl, known as KeA, to godhood by turning her into the Sept-Terrion of mirage known as Demiourgos and through her, overthrow the continent's church and faith. The SSS defeat and arrest the cult's leaders and assume guardianship of KeA.

Development
Trails from Zero was first released in Japan for the PlayStation Portable and was later ported to Windows for release in China in 2011. It was also released for the PlayStation Vita in Japan as Zero no Kiseki: Evolution in October 2012. This version features improved visuals and more voice acting. The Evolution version received a remaster for the PlayStation 4, releasing in Japan as Zero no Kiseki Kai in April 2020. It was also released for the Nintendo Switch in Asia by Clouded Leopard Entertainment in February 2021. 

Due to a variety of reasons, Trails from Zero and its sequel, Trails to Azure, were not localized outside of Japan by the time of the Japanese release of Trails of Cold Steel. Falcom subsequently approached Xseed Games, who had previously localized Trails in the Sky, and requested that a localization of Trails of Cold Steel be prioritized instead, resulting in Trails from Zero and Trails to Azure being skipped. An English fan translation was released by a team known as "Geofront" in March 2020. An official English version by NIS America, using this as the base of the translation, was released for Nintendo Switch, PlayStation 4, and Windows in North America on September 27, 2022, in Europe on September 30, and in Australasia on October 10.

Reception 

Trails from Zero received "generally favorable" reviews, according to review aggregator Metacritic, with praise going to its story, cast of characters, combat mechanics, and music. Along with Trails to Azure, Comic Book Resources highlighted the game's "persistent overarching storyline, immersive and detailed settings, masterful character development [and] unique battle system". They noted that despite the lack of an official localization at the time, the plot and characters were integral to understanding later games in the series. Jason Schreier of Bloomberg considered the 2022 English release to be among the best games of the year.

Notes

References

External links
 

2010 video games
Japanese role-playing video games
Nihon Falcom games
Nintendo Switch games
PlayStation 4 games
PlayStation Portable games
PlayStation Vita games
Role-playing video games
Single-player video games
The Legend of Heroes
Trails (series)
Video games about police officers
Video games developed in Japan
Windows games